Bonče (Бонче) is a village in the Prilep municipality, in North Macedonia. It used to be part of the former municipality of Topolčani.

In September 2007 archeological excavations revealed a tomb of what is believed to be the burial site of a Macedonian ruler dating 4th century BC.

Gallery

References

External links
 Article in Macedonian about the excavations 21.09.2007

Villages in Prilep Municipality